NCD may refer to:

New Centre-Right, a former political party in Italy
National Cleavage Day
National coverage determination, for US Medicare
National Council on Disability, US
National Center for Digitization (Serbia)
Naval Combat Dress, a uniform of the Canadian Forces
Naval Construction Division of the U.S. Navy Seabees
Nemine contradicente, for "with no one speaking against"
Network Computing Devices, a company
Neurocognitive disorder
Non-communicable disease
Non-convergent discourse
Normalized compression distance
Nearly completely decomposable Markov chain, in probability theory
No claim discount on insurance policies